José Doth de Oliveira (1 March 1938 – 26 November 2017) was a Brazilian Roman Catholic prelate.

Born in Pedra Branca, Ceará, Doth de Oliveira was ordained to the priesthood in 1964. He served as the Bishop of Iguatu from 2000 until he resigned in 2009. He died due to complications from Alzheimer's disease on 26 November 2017 in Pedra Branca, at the age of 79.

References

External links
 José Doth de Oliveira at Catholic-Hierarchy.org

1938 births
2017 deaths
21st-century Roman Catholic bishops in Brazil
Deaths from Alzheimer's disease
Deaths from dementia in Brazil
People from Ceará
Roman Catholic bishops of Iguatu
Roman Catholic bishops of Palmares